Gus Honeybun was the station mascot for Westward Television, and later Television South West, from 1961 to December 1992. A puppet rabbit, and star of Gus Honeybun's Magic Birthdays, he achieved a longevity for a TV puppet second only to the Sooty characters.

The clips were filmed at Westward/TSW's Plymouth studios in the Derry's Cross part of the city. There were four different Gus Honeybun puppets and TSW employed a person to create Gus Honeybun's wardrobe. Gus had a theme tune composed by TV composer Ed Welch. A short video was made to accompany it, featuring Gus and several TSW presenters walking around in Plymouth. A 7" picture disc single of the theme song was released in 1987 to several local record shops. Other Gus merchandise available included cuddly toy puppets, keyrings and car stickers. One car sticker said "Watch Gus on TSW!" and had his face and the TSW logo on it.

The character was devised to fill unsold advertising slots during children's TV broadcasts. Several ITV franchise stations had at one time had a regional birthdays slot (often following Children's ITV or the predecessor children's television slot) with a continuity announcer and puppet announcing children's birthdays. With Gus, the announcer would read out a birthday card and the puppet would give a jump, known as a bunny hop, for each year of the child's life. Alternatives to bunny hops were ear waggles, head stands, winks and later "putting out the lights" and a colour-distorting "magic button". Gus appeared with virtually every Westward/TSW presenter, including the late Ian Stirling, Fern Britton, Judi Spiers, David Fitzgerald, Ruth Langsford and Sally Meen. The character was given the full name Augustus Jeremiah Honeybun by some continuity announcers, and was said to have been found under a gorse bush on Dartmoor in 1961 by the founders of Westward Television.

During the TSW era, Gus was broadcast twice a day on weekdays (before and after Children's ITV), and usually once a day at weekends. The show usually lasted about 2 or 3 minutes per episode. From 1987 to 1990, TSW used to often opt out of showing the first and last Children's ITV in-vision continuity links of the day so it could fit in Gus' birthday slot on weekday afternoons.

There was also a TSW-/Gus-branded Hoppa bus, made by local bus and coach company Western National. It was in regular use on most service routes until TSW's demise in 1992.

Westcountry Cult
Gus Honeybun attracted a cult following and it was not unknown for adults to write in requesting "bunny hops" etc. 12 was the official age limit for having a birthday read out on air, so people of 40 were presented as being 4 and so on.

Gus Honeybun was so identified with regional television in the south-west that when TSW's managing director Harry Turner presented the station's ITV franchise renewal in 1991 he took Gus with him.  However, Gus's Magic Birthdays series and his career at the station were ended at the start of 1993, when Westcountry Television took over from TSW after winning the franchise.

The last ever Gus Honeybun programme, aired on 31 December 1992, at the tail end of the final TSW Today, which paid tribute to the station's 11 years of service, saw Gus returned to the moor and reunited with his rabbit family with the help of continuity announcers Ruth Langsford and David Fitzgerald. The successor ITV franchise Westcountry did provide a programme called Birthday People, but this was cancelled in 2004.

In popular culture
The puppet was spoofed on Victoria Wood As Seen On TV by Susie Blake's continuity announcer character accompanied by 'Wally Wallaby'. Terry Wogan for some time referred to Gloria Hunniford (whose show preceded his on national BBC Radio 2) as Gloria Honeybun.

In the post-apocalyptic novel by Jasper Fforde entitled Shades of Grey, which is set 1500 years into the future, Devon and Cornwall are known as 'The Honeybun Peninsula'.

External links

 Gus at Flambards
   South West Film & Television Archive

References

Television characters introduced in 1961
Puppets
1961 British television series debuts
1992 British television series endings
1960s British children's television series
1970s British children's television series
1980s British children's television series
1990s British children's television series
British television shows featuring puppetry
Television series about rabbits and hares
Mass media in Cornwall
Television shows produced by Westward Television
Television shows produced by Television South West (TSW)
English-language television shows